is a retired Japanese footballer.

Club statistics
Updated to 25 February 2019.

References

External links
 Profile at Oita Trinita
 Profile at Kamatamare Sanuki

  "Kenji Baba - Player Profile - Football" - Eurosport Australia

1985 births
Living people
Kindai University alumni
Association football people from Kanagawa Prefecture
People from Hiratsuka, Kanagawa
Japanese footballers
J1 League players
J2 League players
J3 League players
Vissel Kobe players
Shonan Bellmare players
Mito HollyHock players
Kamatamare Sanuki players
Oita Trinita players
FC Gifu players
Kagoshima United FC players
Association football forwards